The politics of Virginia have followed major historical events and demographic changes in the commonwealth. In the 21st century, the northern region has become more liberal in attitudes and voting, constituting a reliable voting bloc for Democrats and joining with population centers in the Richmond Metropolitan and Hampton Roads areas to dominate the state. Political orientation varies by region, with the larger cities and suburban areas generally voting Democratic and the rural areas voting Republican. The southern, rural regions have remained rural and conservative. Until 2021 when the GOP swept all state-wide offices, Virginia was shifting more Democratic and now is considered a swing-state again by most pundits. 

Eight Presidents of the United States were born in Virginia, the most of any state. In fact, 4 out of 5 of the first Presidents were born within its boundaries. George Washington, Thomas Jefferson, James Madison, James Monroe, William Henry Harrison, John Tyler, Zachary Taylor, and Woodrow Wilson were all Virginians at birth. Numerous other influential politicians, such as Patrick Henry, an American Founding Father, have also come from Virginia.

History

After the American Civil War (1861–1865), Virginia was in political turmoil. 48 former counties now in West Virginia were gone, soon to be joined by two more.  The Commonwealth of Virginia unsuccessfully appealed to the U.S. Supreme Court. In the remaining area, many citizens, mostly males of African American heritage, were newly enfranchised to vote. Many others, primarily former Confederates, were initially disenfranchised.

Elections resumed after 5 years as a U.S. Military District, and control was chaotic. In the late 1870s, a coalition of Conservative Democrats, Republicans, and African Americans was assembled and the Readjuster Party took power for about 10 years. After U.S. Senator William Mahone and the Readjuster Party lost control of Virginia politics around 1883, white Democrats regained the state legislature.  They proceeded to use statute and a new constitution in 1901, with provisions such as a poll tax, residency requirements, and literacy test to disfranchise most African Americans and many poor whites. Their disfranchisement lasted until after the passage of civil rights legislation in the mid-1960s.

White Democrats created a one-party state, with a nearly unchallenged majority of state and most federal offices through the middle of the 20th century.  The Byrd Organization headed by Harry F. Byrd Sr. largely controlled statewide politics. Through their leadership and activism in the Civil Rights Movement, African Americans gained national support for passage of the Civil Rights Act of 1964 and the Voting Rights Act of 1965, which provided Federal oversight and enforcement to maintain all citizens' ability to vote. Under Section 5 of the Voting Rights Act, decisions affecting elections are subject to preclearance by the U.S. Department of Justice before they can take effect.

President Lyndon Johnson's and national Democrats' support for civil rights turned many conservative whites in Virginia against the Democrats.  However, many Virginians had been willing to support Republicans, at least at the national level, since the 1930s due to Franklin Roosevelt's strong support for organized labor. While the Republican Party in most of the South tended to attract right-wing conservatives like Jesse Helms and Strom Thurmond, Virginia's GOP has tended to be more moderate by regional standards. The state elected moderate Republican A. Linwood Holton Jr. in 1970; Holton became the first Republican governor in the 20th century, effectively ending the influence of the Byrd Organization.  The current Virginia State Constitution was created in 1971 to replace the discriminatory one created in 1901.  Holton was succeeded by two other Republican governors: the more conservative Mills Godwin (a former Democrat) and John N. Dalton. Five-term U.S. Senator John Warner and Congressman Tom Davis also exemplified the more "moderate-conservative" tendencies of Virginia Republicans.  From 1982 through 1994, Democrats served as governor, with Chuck Robb elected in 1981 and Gerald L. Baliles in 1985.  In 1989, Virginia elected Democrat Douglas Wilder governor, who served from 1990 to 1994, as Virginia's first African-American governor.  In 2001, Virginia elected Democrats Mark Warner as governor and Tim Kaine as lieutenant governor, and Kaine was elected to succeed Warner as governor in 2005.  In 2009, however, a Republican again returned to the governor's mansion as Bob McDonnell defeated Democrat Creigh Deeds, garnering 58.61% of the popular vote to Deeds' 41.25%.  Republicans also managed to sweep all statewide races in 2009, the first time they accomplished this feat since 1997.

Virginia voted for Republicans in nearly every presidential election from 1952 to 2004 except for the Democratic landslide in President Johnson's election in 1964.  This former streak started when Richard Nixon began the Southern Strategy, and is the longest among the former Confederate States. Virginia was the only such state to vote for Gerald Ford over Jimmy Carter in 1976. Since 2008, Virginia has voted for Democrats in presidential elections, including Barack Obama; in 2016, Virginia was the only former Confederate state to vote for Hillary Clinton over Donald Trump.

Regional differences play a large part in Virginia politics. Rural southern and western areas moved to support the Republican Party in response to its "southern strategy", while urban and growing suburban areas, including much of Northern Virginia and recently, Richmond form the Democratic Party base in response to their "Identity politics strategy". Democratic support also persists in union-influenced Roanoke in Southwest Virginia, college towns such as Charlottesville and Blacksburg, and the southeastern Black Belt Region. Enfranchisement and immigration of other groups, especially Hispanics, have placed growing importance on minority voting, while voters that identify as "white working-class" declined by three percent between 2008 and 2012. State election seasons traditionally start with the annual Shad Planking event in Wakefield.

Recent events

In 2007, the Virginia General Assembly proposed Civil Remedial Fees or "abusive driver fees" were fines that could exceed $1,000 for certain moving violations.  The proposal had gained bi-partisan support as a way to generate revenue while not increasing taxes.  An online petition to oppose the bill quickly gathered nearly 100,000 signatures. These were repealed one year later in 2008 and fees were refunded.

Criticism
Dozens of delegates run unopposed each election cycle, which led 2001 Libertarian gubernatorial candidate and former national Libertarian Party chair Bill Redpath to conclude that "Virginia has a democracy that is uncompetitive and boring." Redpath proposed eliminating the 40 single-member districts and have all state senators run state-wide, with the top 40 candidates with the highest vote count getting elected.  However, this proposal would give more power to the highly populated urban areas of the state, and thus has little chance of statewide support.

Districting

Congressional representation

Senate
Tim Kaine (D) won the seat in 2012.
Mark Warner (D) won the seat in 2008.

House
1st District: Rob Wittman (R) 
2nd District: Jen Kiggans (R) 
3rd District: Bobby Scott (D) 
4th District: Jennifer McClellan (D) 
5th District: Bob Good (R) 
6th District: Ben Cline (R) 
7th District: Abigail Spanberger (D) 
8th District: Don Beyer (D) 
9th District: Morgan Griffith (R) 
10th District: Jennifer Wexton (D) 
11th District: Gerry Connolly (D) 

Virginia is part of the United States District Court for the Western District of Virginia and the United States District Court for the Eastern District of Virginia in the federal judiciary. The district's cases are appealed to the Richmond-based United States Court of Appeals for the Fourth Circuit.

Elections

State elections
Political party strength in Virginia has likewise been in flux. In the 2007 state elections, Democrats regained control of the State Senate, and narrowed the Republican majority in the House of Delegates to eight seats. Yet elections in 2009 resulted in the election of Republican Bob McDonnell as Governor by a seventeen-point margin, the election of a Republican Lieutenant Governor and Attorney General, as well as Republican gains of six seats in the House of Delegates. In 2011, the Republican caucus took over two-thirds (68–32) of the seats in the House of Delegates, and a majority of the Senate based on the Lieutenant Governor Bill Bolling as the tie-breaker.

Unity control only lasted two years, and in the 2013 elections, Democrat Terry McAuliffe was elected Governor by two percentage points, and Democrat Ralph Northam was elected Lieutenant Governor by double digits. Republicans, however, maintained their super-majority (68–32) in the House of Delegates.

The 2017 statewide elections resulted in Democrats holding the three highest offices, with outgoing lieutenant governor Ralph Northam winning the governorship, Justin Fairfax becoming the second African-American elected lieutenant governor, and Mark Herring continuing as attorney general. Republicans meanwhile continued a statewide electoral drought that dates to McDonnell's 2009 gubernatorial victory. In concurrent House of Delegates elections, Democrats flipped fifteen of the Republicans' previous sixteen-seat majority. Control of the House came down to the tied election in the 94th district, which was won by Republicans through drawing of lots, giving them a 51–49 majority.

In 2019, Democrats took full control of the state's legislature, flipping at least two state senate seats and five state house seats from Republican to Democratic candidates.

In 2021, Republicans retook control of the House of Delegates, flipping at least seven seats from Democratic to Republican candidates.  Additionally, Glenn Youngkin, a Republican, defeated Terry McAuliffe in the governor's race, Virginia elected its first black female lieutenant governor Winsome Sears, a Republican, and elected Virginia's first Latino attorney general, Jason Miyares, a Republican.

Federal elections

In federal elections since 2006, both parties have seen successes. Republican Senator George Allen lost close races in 2006, to Democratic newcomer Jim Webb, and again in 2012, to Webb's replacement, former Governor Tim Kaine. In 2008, Democrats won both United States Senate seats; former Democratic Governor Mark Warner was elected to replace retiring Republican John Warner (no relation).  The state went Republican in 11 out of 12 presidential elections from 1948 to 2004, including 10 in a row from 1968 to 2004.  However, Democrat Barack Obama carried Virginia's 13 electoral votes in both the 2008 and 2012 presidential elections.

In the 2010 elections, Republicans won three United States House of Representatives seats from the Democrats. Of the state's eleven seats in the House of Representatives, Democrats hold seven and Republicans hold four. The state is widely considered blue-leaning, a trend that moves parallel with the growth of the Washington D.C. and Richmond suburbs. A Federal District Court redrew the malapportioned 3rd District as violating the Voting Rights Act for the 2016 election. That allowed Virginians to choose an additional Representative from the 4th District, and added one to the Democratic total. In the 2018 elections, Democrats flipped 3 seats and obtained a 7–4 majority for the first time since 2008. In the 2022 elections, Democrats lost one of those seats in the 2nd district and were reduced to 6–5.

Statewide referendums
In 2006, a statewide referendum on the Marshall-Newman Amendment added a provision to the Bill of Rights of the Virginia Constitution banning gay marriage; it passed with 57% of the vote. The amendment was later ruled unconstitutional in 2014, in the case of Bostic v. Schaefer.

See also
Government of Virginia
Elections in Virginia
List of politics by U.S. state
Republican Party of Virginia
Democratic Party of Virginia
Libertarian Party of Virginia
Green Party of Virginia
Independent Greens of Virginia
Law of Virginia
Shad Planking

References

External links